"What's So Good About Goodbye" was a 1961 hit single recorded by R&B group The Miracles for Motown Records' Tamla label, later included on their 1962 album I'll Try Something New. The single was the Miracles’ second Top 40 Pop hit, peaking at number 35 on the Billboard Hot 100 in the United States during the winter of 1962, and a Top 20 R&B hit as well, peaking at number 16 on Billboard's R&B singles chart.

Background
"What's So Good About Goodbye" was written by Miracles lead singer Smokey Robinson, "What's So Good About Goodbye" explores a relationship on the verge of breakup. This song, particularly Miracles member Marv Tarplin's guitar licks, proved a major influence on The Beatles, and inspired their song "Ask Me Why".  Its B-side, "I've Been Good To You", was also a hit, charting at number 103 in the U.S. It too was an influence on The Beatles, most notably shown on their 1968 recording “Sexy Sadie”.  Both songs were performed on the group's first live album, The Miracles Recorded Live on Stage.

Personnel
Smokey Robinson - lead vocals
Claudette Rogers Robinson - background vocals
Pete Moore - background vocals
Ronnie White - background vocals
Bobby Rogers - background vocals
Marv Tarplin - guitar
 The Funk Brothers - instrumentation

Chart performance

Cover Versions
"What's So Good About Goodbye" was later covered by: 
The Temptations, who included on their 1965 album The Temptations Sing Smokey. 
The Jackson 5 (Unreleased from 1969) 
Rock band Quix*o*tic
Canadian group Giant Sunflower.

References

External links
 
 The Miracles: "What's So Good About Goodbye" - Song review from the " Motown Junkies" website

The Miracles songs
Songs written by Smokey Robinson
Tamla Records singles
1961 singles
1962 singles
Song recordings produced by Berry Gordy
1961 songs